The Cosmographia ("Cosmography") from 1544 by Sebastian Münster (1488–1552) is the earliest German-language description of the world. It also contains the earliest preserved text in the Latvian language.

It had numerous editions in different languages including Latin, French (translated by François de Belleforest), Italian and Czech. Only extracts have been translated into English. The last German edition was published in 1628, long after Munster's death. The Cosmographia was one of the most successful and popular books of the 16th century. It passed through 24 editions in 100 years. This success was due to the notable woodcuts (some by Hans Holbein the Younger, Urs Graf, Hans Rudolph Manuel Deutsch, and David Kandel). It was most important in reviving geography in 16th-century Europe. Among the notable maps within Cosmographia is the map "Tabula novarum insularum", which is credited as the first map to show the American continents as geographically discrete.

His earlier geographic works were Germania descriptio (1530) and Mappa Europae (1536). In 1540, he published a Latin edition of Ptolemy's Geographia with illustrations.

Contents

As late as the 1598 edition, the content consisted of:

 Book I: Astronomy, Mathematics, Physical Geography, Cartography
 Book II: England, Scotland, Ireland, Spain, France, Belgium, The Netherlands, Luxembourg, Savoy, Trier, Italy
 Book III: Germany, Alsace, Switzerland, Austria, Carniola, Istria, Bohemia, Moravia, Silesia, Pomerania, Prussia, Livland
 Book IV: Denmark, Norway, Sweden, Finland, Iceland, Hungary, Poland, Lithuania, Russia, Walachia, Bosnia, Bulgaria, Serbia, Greece, Turkey
 Book V: Asia Minor, Cyprus, Armenia, Palestine, Arabia, Persia, Central Asia, Afghanistan, Scythia, Tartary, India, Ceylon, Burma, China, East Indies, Madagascar, Zanzibar, America
 Book VI: Mauritania, Tunisia, Libya, Egypt, Senegal, Gambia, Mali, South Africa, East Africa

Editions
 German: 1544 Basel, 1546, 1548, 1550, 1553, 1556, 1558, 1561, 1564, 1567, 1569, 1572, 1574, 1578, 1588, 1592, 1598, 1614, 1628
 Latin: 1550 Basel, 1552, 1554, 1559, 1572
 French: 1552 Basel, 1556, 1560, 1565, 1568, 1575 Paris (editor Francois de Belleforest).
 Italian: 1558 Basel, undated Venezia, 1575 Koln.
 Czech: 1554 Praha.

Excerpts only:
 German: 1820 J.G.J. Seybold, Munchen.
 French: 1779 Ruault, Paris (ed. Nicolas Gobet); 1872 Librarie des Philosophes, Paris; 1883 A. Quantin, Paris.
 English: 1552 W. Marshall, London (abridged ed.); 1553 Edward Sutton, London (ed. Richard Eden); 1561 Lahon Awdely, London (ed. George North); 1572 Thomas Marche, London (ed. Richard Eden); 1574 Thomas Marche, London (ed. Richard Eden); 1577 Richard Jugge, London (ed. Richard Eden); 1885 Turnbull & Spears, Edinburgh & Birmingham (ed. Edward Arber); 1895 A. Constable & Co., Westminster (ed. Edward Arber).

Gallery

References

Further reading
 Karl Heinz Burmeister: Sebastian Münster - Versuch eines biographischen Gesamtbildes. Basler Beiträge zur Geschichtswissenschaft, Band 91, Basel und Stuttgart 1963 und 1969.
 Karl Heinz Burmeister: Sebastian Münster - Eine Bibliographie. Wiesbaden 1964.
 Matthew McLean: The Cosmographia of Sebastian Münster: Describing the World in the Reformation. Aldershot 2007.
 Hans Georg Wehrens: Freiburg in der „Cosmographia“ von Sebastian Münster (1549); in Freiburg im Breisgau 1504 - 1803, Holzschnitte und Kupferstiche. Verlag Herder, Freiburg 2004, S. 34 ff. .
 Günther Wessel: Von einem, der daheim blieb, die Welt zu entdecken - Die Cosmographia des Sebastian Münster oder Wie man sich vor 500 Jahren die Welt vorstellte. Campus Verlag, Frankfurt 2004, .

External links

 
 "Tabula novarum insularum" [Map of America] (Sebastian Münster), at the State Library of New South Wales. 
 "Cosmographia (Sebastian Münster)". Biographisch-Bibliographisches Kirchenlexikon (BBKL) (in German).
 
 Artikel in der TRE
 Lateinische Werke im Internet
 Wer war Sebastian Münster? - Umfangreiche Dokumentensammlung des Sebastian-Münster-Gymnasiums in Ingelheim.
 Sebastian Münster, La Cosmographie universelle online excerpts
 His Map of Asia (1544 AD), Tabula orientalis regionis, Asiae scilicet extremas complectens terras & regna
 Historic Cities: Sebastian Münster
 https://web.archive.org/web/20110607164651/http://www.uni-giessen.de/gloning/at/schreckenfuchs_1553_oratio-funebris-de-obitu-sebastiani-munsteri.pdf
 Munster Map - Simcoe County Archives

1544 books
Geography books